Sri Lanka, having a history as long as many ancient civilizations, positioned at the crossroads of the East and the West, and being a multicultural society, celebrates a wide variety of festivals, ceremonies and events.

Christians celebrate Easter and Christmas. Esala Perahera (A-suh-luh peh-ruh-ha-ruh) is a grand festival in the month of Esala held in Sri Lanka. Happening in July or August in Kandy, it has become a unique symbol of Sri Lanka. It is a Buddhist festival consisting of dances and richly decorated elephants. There are fire-dances, whip-dances, Kandyan dances and various other cultural dances. The elephants are usually adorned with lavish garments. The festival ends with the traditional 'diya-kepeema'. The elephant is paraded around the city carrying a casket venerated by Buddhists as bearing the Relic of the tooth of the Buddha.

Festivals and events by Gregorian calendar dates 
(This order may differ from year to year due astrological and astronomical reasons)

January 

 January - Duruthu Full Moon Poya - (Religious/Buddhist)
 January - The Initial Aluth Sahal Mangallaya (New Rice Festival) at the Temple of the Tooth; - (Customary/Sinhalese/Agriculture related)
 January - Patti Pongal - (Religious/Hindu/Agriculture related)
 January - Patti Kiri Ithirima - (Customary/Sinhalese/Agriculture related)

February 

 February - The National Day (Independence Day) - (Customary/Political/Commemorating the Political Freedom attained from the British Empire)
 February - Navam Full Moon Poya - (Religious/Buddhist)

March 

 March - Maha Shivaratri - (Religious/Hindu)
 March - Mawlid - (Religious/Islam)
 March - Medin Full Moon Poya - (Religious/Buddhist)
 March - Good Friday - (Religious/Catholic/Christian)
 March - Easter - (Religious/Catholic/Christian)

April 
 
 April - Day Prior to Sinhalese and Tamil New Year - (Religious/Customary/Buddhist/Hindu/Sinhalese/Agriculture related/Astrology related)
 April - Sinhalese and Tamil New Year - (Religious/Customary/Buddhist/Hindu/Sinhalese/Agriculture related/Astrology related)
 April - National herbal oil ceremony - (Customary/Buddhist/Sinhalese/Astrology related)
 April - Bak Full Moon Poya - (Religious/Buddhist)

May 

 May - May Day - (Customary/Political)
 May - Watching the new moon for the new Solar year - (Customary/Astrology related)
 May - Vesak Full Moon Poya (Vesak) - (Religious/Buddhist)

June 

 June - Poson Full Moon Poya - (Religious/Buddhist)
 June - Ramadan (Eid al-Fitr) (Religious/Muslim)

July 

 July - Esala Full Moon Poya - (Religious/Buddhist)

August 

 August - Nikini Full Moon Poya - (Religious/Buddhist)
 August - Esala Perahera - (Customary/Religious/Political/Buddhist/Hindu/Sinhalese)

September 

 September - Binara Full Moon Poya - (Religious/Buddhist)

October 

 October - Vap Full Moon Poya - (Religious/Buddhist)
 October - Diwali - (Religious/Hindu)

November 

 November - Il Full Moon Poya - (Religious/Buddhist)
 Hajj (Eid al-Adha) - (Religious/Islam)

December 

 December - Unduvap Full Moon Poya - (Religious/Buddhist)
 December - Christmas - (Religious/Catholic/Christian)

References

 
Festivals